Petitclercia is a genus of molluscs from the strigoceratid subfamily Disticocratinae which are included in the ammonitid superfamily Haplocerataceae. Petitclercia, named by Rollier, 1909.

The shell of Petitclercia is involute, very compressed, with a sharp umbilical angle and sharp fastigate venter. Spath (1928)speculated that Petitclercia is perhaps "an involute development of Chanasia", another of the Distichoceratinae.

Distribution
Only found in the upper Middle Jurassic (Callovian) of Vendée, France.

References

 Treatise on Invertebrate Paleontology, Part L, Ammonoidea; (L279), Geological Society of America and Univ of Kansas press, 1964

Ammonitida genera
Jurassic ammonites
Fossils of France